Caillou's Holiday Movie is a 2003 Canadian animated Christmas film, based on the Canadian TV series Caillou, itself based on the book series of the same name by Hélène Desputeaux.

Caillou's Holiday Movie was released direct-to-video on VHS and DVD on October 7, 2003.

Plot
It's a very special holiday for Caillou when he learns about Christmas traditions around the world and the importance of giving and sharing. When Caillou wonders just how many days there are left until Christmas, his father, Boris gives him a Christmas calendar featuring holiday traditions from countries around the world in every window. Caillou also goes tobogganing, learns how to ski and plays Hanukkah games with his friend Leo. Caillou also gives away some of his toys when he learns about children around the world that are in need of toys such as his old ones he no longer plays with. Caillou's little sister Rosie also gets in on the Christmas fun. When Doris offers to help Rosie with making gifts, Rosie decides to try it on her own. The film features several songs performed by the cast of the film, including "Where Christmas is Not the Same", "Eight Days to Go" and "Everyday", which was performed by French-Canadian artist Marilou.

Production
Caillou's Holiday Movie was produced at Caillou Special 1 Productions Inc (A subsidiary of CINAR Corporation). The previous English voice actress for Caillou, Jaclyn Linetsky, who also played Lori Mackney in “What's with Andy?”and Megan O‘ Connor in 15/Love, died in a traffic collision a month before release, and the film was dedicated in her memory. 

Annie Bovaird was cast to replace Linetsky as the voice of Caillou. The film was directed by Nick Rijgersberg, written by Peter Svatek and produced by Evelyn Anyosz, Andre Auger, Diane Dallaire, Natalie Dumoulin, Louis Fournier, Julie Lovelock, Lesley Taylor and Steven Valin.

Voice cast

Soundtrack

The soundtrack was released seven years later, featuring 18 songs. The score was composed by Jeffrey Zahn, but it wasn't featured in the soundtrack. The soundtrack was released in Canada on December 14, 2010 and became available on the Canadian iTunes Store.

Reception
Mark Van Hook concluded the film is "inoffensive but bland", adding: "recommending it only to young children", in a review for DVD Verdict.

Home media
Warner Home Video released the film in VHS and DVD on October 7, 2003.

The special features in the DVD include: an animated interview with Caillou; more holiday songs; the read-along of The Night Before Christmas; and six Caillou challenges, all in English, French or Spanish languages.

The film was presented in full screen as well as in 2.0 Dolby Surround audio. The film was re-released by NCircle Entertainment and DHX Media (as part of Caillou's 27th anniversary) on November 11, 2014.

See also
 List of Christmas films

References

External links
 

2003 direct-to-video films
2003 animated films
Canadian direct-to-video films
Canadian animated feature films
Canadian children's animated films
Canadian Christmas films
English-language Canadian films
Animated films based on animated series
Direct-to-video animated films
DHX Media films
2000s children's animated films
2000s English-language films
Quebec films
2000s Canadian films
Animated films about children